Mad Rally is a racing video game developed by an internal team based in Poland known as TMReality and published by Play Publishing for Windows. In the game, the player has to progress through the career mode while unlocking better vehicles.

Gameplay
Each race consists of 4 vehicles – one controlled by the player, while the other three by artificial intelligence. There are 4 game modes.

Career - The main mode of the entire game which leads to progression in the game and unlocks new vehicles. The goal of the player is to get a podium finish in 7 of the 16 available tracks. 
Tourist - Player is alone and free to observe and race anywhere on the race track.
Time Trial - Has the player race against the clock in the fastest time possible.
Race - Features a competitive mode against other opponents but will not progress the game forward as opposed to career mode.

Vehicles
The game consists of 7 different Polish cars out of which one is available for use and the rest 6 can be unlocked by progressing through the career mode. Following are the 7 cars:

Routes
There are 9 different tracks in career mode which can be unlocked by playing the game. Out of all the 16 tracks, some tracks are reversed. Following are the 9 tracks:

Reception
Mad Rally received negative reviews, getting 24% on AG.ru.

See also
List of driving/racing style video games
Racing video game
Sim racing

References

2006 video games
Racing video games
Video games developed in Poland
Windows games
Windows-only games